Nancy Nathanson (born 1951 in Dallas, Texas) is a Democratic member of the Oregon House of Representatives, representing the 13th district. Nathanson attended Northwestern University, and later the University of Oregon where she received a Bachelor of Science in urban geography.

Political career

Eugene City Council
In 1992, Nathanson was elected to the Eugene City Council, succeeding Roger Rutan in Ward 8. During her time on the council, Nathanson received multiple awards including; the "Outstanding Elected Official Award," presented by the Lane Council of Governments in 2001; the "James C. Richards Memorial Award," presented by the League of Oregon Cities in 2004; and the "West Eugene Wetlands Award," presented by the Wetland Executive Team in 2005. Nathanson ran for Mayor of Eugene in 2004, but lost in the primary election to her opponent, and former mayor Kitty Piercy.

Oregon House of Representatives
In 2006, Nathanson was elected to her first term in the Oregon House of Representatives, defeating the Republican candidate Monica Johnson. According to The Oregonian, Nathanson votes with Democrats 98.68% of the time, and misses votes 0.66% of the time.

Endorsements
According to Nathanson, she is endorsed by multiple organizations including the Oregon AFL-CIO, Planned Parenthood, the Amalgamated Transit Union, Basic Rights Oregon, the American Federation of Teachers, the United Transportation Union, and Stand for Children.

Committee assignments
Committee on Ways and Means (Vice-Chair)
Subcommittee On Capital Construction and Info Technology
Subcommittee On General Government (Co-Chair)
Subcommittee On Public Safety

Personal
Nathanson resides in Eugene, Oregon, with her husband Steve Robinson. Nathanson moved to Eugene in 1973. She attended Hillcrest High School in Dallas, Texas. She was also a tap dance instructor in Eugene for several years. Nathanson named United States Representative Peter DeFazio as an Oregonian who inspires her in an interview with BlueOregon.

References

External links
Official Government Web Site
Re-election Web Site
Nathanson at Project Vote Smart

1951 births
Living people
Oregon city council members
Democratic Party members of the Oregon House of Representatives
Women state legislators in Oregon
Politicians from Dallas
University of Oregon alumni
Northwestern University alumni
Women city councillors in Oregon
21st-century American politicians
21st-century American women politicians